Townhouse Row is a set of seven historic townhouses located at Chambersburg in Franklin County, Pennsylvania. They are three-story, brick townhouses built starting in the third quarter of the 19th century.  They were built following the burning of Chambersburg by the Confederate Army in the American Civil War.  Individual townhouses have undergone various additions and modifications after their initial construction.

They were listed on the National Register of Historic Places in 1978.  They are included in the Chambersburg Historic District.

References 

Houses on the National Register of Historic Places in Pennsylvania
Houses in Franklin County, Pennsylvania
National Register of Historic Places in Franklin County, Pennsylvania
Individually listed contributing properties to historic districts on the National Register in Pennsylvania